The Ninian is a river in Brittany, France. Its main tributaries are the Trelan (at Mohon), the Léverin (at Taupont), the Yvel (at Ploërmel) and the Guerfo. It flows into the Oust near to Montertelot.

References

Rivers of Brittany
Rivers of France
Rivers of Côtes-d'Armor
Rivers of Morbihan